The speckled blenny (Acanthemblemaria betinensis) is a species of chaenopsid blenny found in coral reefs in the western Caribbean, from Puerto Limón to Colombia.

References

Acanthemblemaria
Fish of Panama
Fish of Colombia
Fish described in 1974